The Free City of Danzig was a city-state under the protection of the League of Nations between 1920 and 1939, consisting of the Baltic Sea port of Danzig (now Gdańsk, Poland) and nearly 200 other small localities in the surrounding areas. The polity was created on 15 November 1920 in accordance with the terms of Article 100 (Section XI of Part III) of the 1919 Treaty of Versailles after the end of World War I. In line with the treaty provisions, the entity was established under the oversight of the League of Nations. Although predominantly German-populated, the territory was bound by the imposed union with Poland covering foreign policy, defence, customs, railways and post, while remaining distinct from both the post-war German Republic and  the newly independent Polish Republic. In addition, Poland was given certain rights pertaining to port facilities in the city.

In the 1920 Constituent Assembly election, the Polish Party received over 6% of the vote, but its percentage of votes later declined to about 3%. In 1921, Poland began to develop the city of Gdynia, then a midsized fishing town. This completely new port north of Danzig was established on territory awarded in 1919, the so-called Polish Corridor. By 1933, the commerce passing through Gdynia exceeded that of Danzig. Notwithstanding this, Poland refused to relinquish trading and other rights awarded to it, further alienating the Danzigers. By 1936, the city's senate had a majority of local Nazis, and agitation to rejoin Germany was stepped up. Many Jews fled from German antisemitism, persecution, and oppression. In 1938, the Free City's population of 410,000 was 98% German, 1% Polish and 1% other.

After the German invasion of Poland in 1939, the Nazis abolished the Free City and incorporated the area into the newly formed  of Danzig-West Prussia. The Nazis classified the Poles and Jews living in the city as subhumans, subjecting them to discrimination, forced labor, and extermination. Many were murdered at Nazi concentration camps, including nearby Stutthof (now Sztutowo, Poland). Upon the city's capture in the early months of 1945 by the Soviet and Polish troops, a significant number of German inhabitants perished during the ill-prepared and much over-delayed attempts of evacuation over the sea, while the remainder fled or were expelled.

The city was fully reintegrated into Poland as a result of the Potsdam Agreement, while members of the pre-war Polish ethnic minority started returning and new Polish settlers began to come. Gdańsk suffered severe underpopulation from these events and did not recover until the late 1950s.

Establishment

Periods of independence and autonomy
Danzig had an early history of independence. It was a leading player in the Prussian Confederation directed against the Teutonic Monastic State of Prussia. The Confederation stipulated with the Polish king, Casimir IV Jagiellon, that the Polish Crown would be invested with the role of head of state of western parts of Prussia (Royal Prussia). In contrast, Ducal Prussia remained a Polish fief. Danzig and other cities such as Elbing and Thorn financed most of the warfare and enjoyed a high level of city autonomy. Danzig used the title Royal Polish City of Danzig.

In 1569, when Royal Prussia's estates agreed to incorporate the region into the Polish–Lithuanian Commonwealth, the city insisted on preserving its special status. It defended itself through the costly Siege of Danzig in 1577 in order to preserve special privileges, and subsequently insisted on negotiating by sending emissaries directly to the Polish king. Danzig's location as a deep-water port where the Vistula river met the Baltic Sea had made it into one of the wealthiest cities in Europe in the 16th and 17th centuries as grain from Poland and Ukraine was shipped down the Vistula on barges to be loaded onto ships in Danzig, where it was shipped on to western Europe. As many of the merchants shipping the grain from Danzig were Dutch, who built Dutch-style houses for themselves, leading to other Danzigers imitating them, the city was thus given a distinctively Dutch appearance. Danzig become known as "the Amsterdam of the East", a wealthy seaport and trading crossroads that linked together the economics of western and eastern Europe, and whose location at where the Vistula flowed into the Baltic led to various powers competing to rule the city.

Although Danzig became part of the Kingdom of Prussia in the Second Partition of Poland in 1793, Prussia was conquered by Napoleon Bonaparte in 1806, and in September 1807 Napoleon declared Danzig a semi-independent client state of the French Empire, known as the Free City of Danzig. It lasted seven years, until it was re-incorporated into the Kingdom of Prussia in 1814, after Napoleon's defeat at the Battle of Leipzig (Battle of Nations) by a coalition that included Russia, Austria, and Prussia. The city remained part of Prussia until 1920, becoming part of the Reich in 1871.

Point 13 of U.S. president Woodrow Wilson's Fourteen Points called for Polish independence to be restored and for Poland to have "secure access to the sea", a promise that implied that Danzig, which occupied a strategic location where the Vistula river flowed into the Baltic sea, should become part of Poland. At the Paris Peace Conference in 1919, the Polish delegation led by Roman Dmowski asked for Wilson to honor point 13 of the Fourteen Points by transferring Danzig to Poland, arguing that Poland would not be economically viable without Danzig and that since the city had been part of Poland until 1793, it was rightfully part of Poland anyway. However, Wilson had promised that national self-determination would be the basis of the Treaty of Versailles. As 90% of the people in Danzig in this period were German, the Allied leaders at the Paris Peace Conference compromised by creating the Free City of Danzig, a city-state in which Poland had certain special rights. It was felt that including a city that was 90% German into Poland would be a violation of the principle of national self-determination, but at the same time the promise in the Fourteen  Points of allowing Poland "secure access to the sea" gave Poland a claim on Danzig, hence the compromise of the Free City of Danzig.

The Free City of Danzig was largely the work of British diplomacy as both the French Premier Georges Clemenceau and U.S. President Woodrow Wilson supported the Polish claim to Danzig (Gdańsk), and it was only objections from the British Prime Minister David Lloyd George that prevented Danzig from going to Poland. Despite creating the Free City, the British did not really believe in the viability of the Free City of Danzig with Lloyd George writing at the time: "France would tomorrow fight for Alsace if her right to it were contested. But would we make war for Danzig?" The Foreign Secretary Arthur Balfour wrote in the summer of 1918 that the Germans had such a ferocious contempt for Poles that it was unwise for Germany to lose any territory to Poland even if morally justified as the Germans would never accept losing land to the despised Poles and such a situation was bound to cause a war. During the Paris Peace Conference in 1919, the British consistently sought to minimize German territorial losses to Poland under the grounds that the Germans had such an utter contempt for the Poles together with the rest of the Slavic peoples that such losses were bound to deeply wound their feelings and cause a war. For all the bitterness of the French–German enmity, the Germans had a certain grudging respect for the French that did not extend to the Poles at all. During the Paris Peace Conference, a commission of inquiry chaired by a British historian, James Headlam-Morley, investigating where the borders between Germany and Poland should be, started to research Danzig's history. Upon discovering that Danzig had been a Free City in the past, Headlam-Morley came up with what he regarded as a brilliant compromise solution under which Danzig would become a Free City again that would belong to neither Germany nor Poland. As the British were opposed to Danzig becoming part of Poland and the French and the Americans to Danzig remaining part of Germany, Headlam-Morley's compromise of the Free City of Danzig was embraced.

The rural areas around Danzig were overwhelmingly Polish and the representatives of the Polish farmers around Danzig complained about being included in the Free City of Danzig, stating they wanted to join Poland. For their part, the representatives of the German population of Danzig complained about being severed from Germany, and constantly demanded that the Free City of Danzig be reincorporated into the Reich. The Canadian historian Margaret MacMillan wrote that a sense of Danzig national identity never emerged during the Free City's existence, and the German population of Danzig always regarded themselves as Germans who had been unjustly taken out of Germany. The loss of Danzig did indeed deeply hurt German national pride and in the interwar period, German nationalists spoke of the "open wound in the east" that was the Free City of Danzig. However, until the building of Gdynia, almost all of Poland's exports went through Danzig, and Polish public opinion was opposed to Germany having a "choke-hold" on the Polish economy.

Territory

The Free City of Danzig (1920–39) included the city of Danzig (Gdańsk), the towns of Zoppot (Sopot), Oliva (Oliwa), Tiegenhof (Nowy Dwór Gdański), Neuteich (Nowy Staw) and some 252 villages and 63 hamlets, covering a total area of 1,966 square kilometers.

In 1928, its territory covered 1,952 km2 including 58 square kilometers of freshwater surface. The border had a length of 290.5 km, of which the coastline accounted for 66.35 km.

Polish rights declared by Treaty of Versailles
The Free City was to be represented abroad by Poland and was to be in a customs union with it. The German railway line that connected the Free City with newly created Poland was to be administered by Poland, as were all rail lines in the territory of the Free City. On November 9, 1920, a convention that provided for the Presence of a Polish diplomatic representative in Danzig was signed between the Polish government and the Danzig authorities. In article 6, the Polish government undertook not to conclude any international agreements regarding Danzig without previous consultation with the Free City's government.

A separate Polish post office was established, besides the existing municipal one.

League of Nations High Commissioners

Unlike Mandatory territories, which were entrusted to member countries, the Free City of Danzig (like the Territory of the Saar Basin) remained directly under the authority of the League of Nations. Representatives of various countries took on the role of High Commissioner:

The League of Nations refused to let the city-state use the term of Hanseatic City as part of its official name; this referred to Danzig's long-lasting membership in the Hanseatic League.

State Constabulary

With the creation of the Free City in the aftermath of World War I a security police force was created on 19 August 1919. On 9 April 1920, a military style marching band, the Musikkorps, was formed. Led by composer Ernst Stieberitz, the police band became well known in the city and abroad. In 1921, Danzig's government reformed the entire institution and established the Schutzpolizei, or protection police. Helmut Froböss became President of the Police (i. e. Chief) on 1 April 1921. He served in this capacity until the German annexation of the city.

The police initially operated from 12 precincts and 7 registration points. In 1926 the number of precincts was reduced to 7.

After the Nazi takeover of the Senate, the police were increasingly used to suppress free speech and political dissent. In 1933, Froböss ordered the left-wing newspapers Danziger Volksstimme and Danziger Landeszeitung to suspend publications for 2 months and 8 days respectively.

By 1939, Polish-German relations had worsened and war seemed a likely possibility. The police began making plans to seize Polish installations within the city, in the event of conflict. Ultimately the Danzig police participated in the September Campaign, fighting alongside the local SS and the German Army at the city's Polish post office and at Westerplatte.

Even though the Free City was formally annexed by Nazi Germany in October 1939, the police force more or less continued to operate as a law enforcement agency. The Stutthof concentration camp, 35 km east of the city, was run by the President of the police as an internment camp from 1939 until November 1941.  Administration was finally dissolved when the city was occupied by the Soviets in 1945.

Population

The Free City's population rose from 357,000 (1919) to 408,000 in 1929; according to the official census, 95% were Germans, with the rest mainly either Kashubians or Poles. According to E. Cieślak, the population registers of the Free City show that in 1929 the Polish population numbered 35,000, or 9.5% of the population.

Henryk Stępniak estimates the 1929 Polish population as around 22,000, or around 6% of the population, increasing to around 13% in the 1930s. Based on the estimated voting patterns (according to Stępniak many Poles voted for the Catholic Zentrumspartei instead of Polish parties), Stępniak estimates the number of Poles in the city to be 25–30% of Catholics living within it or about 30–36 thousand people. Including around 4,000 Polish nationals who were registered in the city, Stępniak estimated the Polish population as 9.4–11% of population. In contrast Stefan Samerski estimates about 10 percent of the 130,000 Catholics were Polish. Andrzej Drzycimski estimates that Polish population at the end of 30s reached 20% (including Poles who arrived after the war).

The Treaty of Versailles required that the newly formed state have its own citizenship, based on residency. German inhabitants lost their German citizenship with the creation of the Free City, but were given the right to re-obtain it within the first two years of the state's existence. Anyone desiring German citizenship had to leave their property and make their residence outside the Free State of Danzig area in the remaining parts of Germany.

Notable people born in the Free City of Danzig

 Eddi Arent (1925 in Danzig – 2013 in Munich) was a German actor, cabaret artist and comedian. He appeared in 104 films between 1956 and 2002. 
 Ike Aronowicz (1923 in Danzig – 2009 Israel) captain of the immigrant ship SS Exodus, which unsuccessfully tried to dock in Mandatory Palestine with Holocaust survivors on July 11, 1947
 Elisabeth Becker (1923 in Danzig – executed 1946 in Biskupia Górka) was a concentration camp guard in World War II.
 Ingrid van Bergen (born 1931 in Danzig) is a German film actress. She has appeared in 100 films since 1954. Convicted of manslaughter in 1977
 Miltiades Caridis (1923 in Danzig – 1998 in Athens) was a German-Greek conductor, his family moved to Greece in 1938.
 Zygmunt Chychła (1926 in Gdańsk – 2009 in Hamburg) was a Polish boxer. He won the Olympic gold medal for Poland at the 1952 Summer Olympics
 Anna M. Cienciala (1929 in Danzig – 2014 in Florida) was a Polish-American historian and author
 Holger Czukay (1938 in Danzig – 2017 in Weilerswist) was a German musician, co-founder of the krautrock group Can
 Horst Ehmke (1927 in Danzig – 2017 in Bonn) was a German lawyer, law professor and SPD politician, served as Federal Minister of Justice (1969) 
 Jörg-Peter Ewert (born 1938 in Danzig) is a German neurophysiologist and researcher into Neuroethology
 Günter Grass (1927 in Danzig – 2015 in Lübeck) was a German novelist, poet, playwright, illustrator, graphic artist, sculptor, and recipient of the 1999 Nobel Prize in Literature.
 Ursula Happe (1926 in Danzig – 2021 in Dortmund) was a German swimmer and Olympic champion. She competed at the 1956 Summer Olympics and won the gold medal in 200 m breaststroke
 Hans Albert Hohnfeldt (1897 in Neufahrwasser – 1948) Nazi Party Gauleiter in Danzig.
 Klaus Kinski (1926 in Zopot – 1991 in Lagunitas, California) was a controversial German actor.
 Wanda Klaff (1922 in Danzig – executed 1946 in Biskupia Górka) was a Nazi camp overseer 
 Heinz-Hermann Koelle (1925 in Danzig – 2011 in Berlin) was an aeronautical engineer, made the preliminary designs for Saturn I
 Erhard Krack (1931 in Danzig – 2000 in Berlin) was an East German politician and mayor of East Berlin from 1974 to 1990.
 Zdzisław Kuźniar (born 1931 in Gdańsk) is a Polish actor.
 Hanna-Renate Laurien (1928 in Danzig – 2010 in Berlin) was a German CDU politician 
 Jack Mandelbaum (born 1927 in Danzig) is a Holocaust survivor 
 Rupert Neudeck (1939 in Danzig – 2016 in Siegburg) correspondent for Deutschlandfunk and founder of Cap Anamur a humanitarian organisation
 Zygmunt Pawłowicz (1927 in Danzig – 2010 in Gdańsk) ordained a Catholic priest in 1952, was the Polish Auxiliary bishop of the Roman Catholic Archdiocese of Gdańsk from 1985 until 2005 
 Avi Pazner (born 1937 in Danzig) is a retired Israeli diplomat
 Richard Pratt (1934 in Danzig – 2009 in Kew, Victoria) was a prominent Australian businessman, chairman of Visy. His family moved to Australia in 1938
 Georg Preuß (1920 in Danzig – 1991 Clenze) was a mid-ranking commander in the Waffen-SS, a convicted war criminal.
 Meta Preuß (1903–1981) one of seven members of the Communist Party (Free City of Danzig), elected  to the Volkstag in 1930. 
 Henry Rosovsky (1927 in Danzig – 2022 in Cambridge, Massachusetts) was an economic historian, specializing in East Asia, born of Russian Jewish parents 
 Hermann Salomon (1938 in Danzig – 2020 in Mainz) was a German javelin thrower who competed in the 1960, 1964 and the 1968 Summer Olympics
 Meir Shamgar (1925 in Danzig – 2019 in Jerusalem) was President of the Israeli Supreme Court 1983–1995.
 Zalman Shoval (born 1930 in Danzig) is an Israeli politician and diplomat
 Wolfgang Völz (1930 in Danzig – 2018 in Berlin) was a German actor, known for his roles in theatre plays, TV shows, feature films and taped radio shows
 F. K. Waechter (1937 in Danzig – 2005 in Frankfurt) was a German cartoonist, author and playwright
 David Dushman (1923 in Danzig - 2021 in Munich) was Jewish-Soviet Red Army soldier, assisted in the liberation of the Auschwitz-Birkenau concentration camp

Religion
In 1924, 54.7% of the populace was Protestant (220,731 persons, mostly Lutherans within the united old-Prussian church), 34.5% was Roman Catholic (140,797 persons), and 2.4% Jewish (9,239 persons). Other Protestants included 5,604 Mennonites, 1,934 Calvinists (Reformed), 1,093 Baptists, 410 Free Religionists, as well as 2,129 dissenters, 1,394 faithful of other religions and denominations, and 664 irreligionists. The Jewish community grew from 2,717 in 1910 to 7,282 in 1923, and 10,448 in 1929, many of them immigrants from Poland and Russia.

Regional Synodal Federation of the Free City of Danzig

The mostly Lutheran and partially Reformed congregations situated in the territory of the Free City, which previously used to belong to the Ecclesiastical Province of West Prussia of the Evangelical Church of the old-Prussian Union (EKapU), were transformed into the Regional Synodal Federation of the Free City of Danzig after 1920. The executive body of that ecclesiastical province, the consistory (est. 1 November 1886), was seated in Danzig. After 1920 it was restricted in its responsibility to those congregations within the Free City's territory. General Superintendent  (1920–1933) and Bishop  (1933–1945) presided over the consistory, one after another.

Danzig's Regional Synodal Federation — just as the regional synodal federation of the autonomous Memelland — retained the status of an ecclesiastical province within EKapU.

After the German annexation of the Free City in 1939, the EKapU merged the Danzig regional synodal federation in 1940 into the Ecclesiastical Region of Danzig-West Prussia. This included the Polish congregations of the United Evangelical Church in Poland in the homonymous Reichsgau Danzig-West Prussia and the German congregations in the West Prussia governorate. Danzig's consistory functioned as an executive body for that region. With the flight and expulsion of most ethnically German Protestant parishioners from the area of the Free City of Danzig between 1945 and 1948, the congregations vanished.

In March 1945, the consistory had relocated to Lübeck and opened a refugee centre for Danzigers (Hilfsstelle beim evangelischen Konsistorium Danzig) led by Upper Consistorial Councillor . The Lutheran congregation of St. Mary's Church could relocate its valuable parament collection and the presbytery granted it on loan to St. Annen Museum in Lübeck after the war. Other Lutheran congregations of Danzig could reclaim their church bells, which the Wehrmacht had requisitioned as non-ferrous metal for war purposes since 1940, but which had survived, not yet melted down, in storage (e.g. ) in the British zone of occupation. The presbyteries granted them usually to Northwestern German Lutheran congregations which had lost bells due to the war.

Diocese of Danzig of the Roman Catholic Church

The 36 Catholic parishes in the territory of the Free City in 1922 used to belong in equal shares to the Diocese of Culm, which was mostly Polish, and the Diocese of Ermland, which was mostly German. While the Second Polish Republic wanted all the parishes within the Free City to form part of Polish Culm, Volkstag and Senate wanted them all to become subject to German Ermland. In 1922 the Holy See suspended the jurisdictions of both dioceses over their parishes in the Free State and established an exempt apostolic administration for the territory.

The first apostolic administrator was Edward O'Rourke (born in Minsk and of Irish ancestry) who became Bishop of Danzig on the occasion of the elevation of the administration to an exempt diocese in 1925. He was naturalised as Danziger on the same occasion. In 1938 he resigned after quarrels with the Nazi-dominated Senate of Danzig on appointments of parish priests of Polish ethnicity. The senate also instigated the denaturalisation of O'Rourke, who subsequently became a Polish citizen. O'Rourke was succeeded by Bishop Carl Maria Splett, a native from the Free City area.

Splett remained bishop after the German annexation of the Free City. In early 1941, he applied for admitting the Danzig diocese as member in Archbishop Adolf Bertram's Eastern German Ecclesiastical Province and thus at the Fulda Conference of Bishops; however, Bertram, also speaker of the Fulda conference, rejected the request. Any arguments that the Free City of Danzig had been annexed to Nazi Germany did not impress Bertram since Danzig's annexation lacked international recognition. Until the reorganization of the Catholic dioceses in Danzig and the formerly eastern territories of Germany the diocesan territory remained unaltered and the see exempt. However, with the replacement of Danzig's population between 1945 and 1948 by mostly Catholic Poles, the number of Catholic parishes increased and most formerly Protestant churches were taken over for Catholic services.

Jewish Danzigers

Since 1883 most of the Jewish congregations in the later territory of Free State had merged into the Synagogal Community of Danzig. Only the Jews of Tiegenhof ran their own congregation until 1938.

Danzig became a centre of Polish and Russian Jewish emigration to North America. Between 1920 and 1925 60,000 Jews emigrated via Danzig to the US and Canada. At the same time, between 1923 and 1929, Danzig's own Jewish population increased from roughly 7,000 to 10,500. Native Jews and newcomers established themselves in the city and contributed to its civic life, culture and economy. Danzig became a venue for international meetings of Jewish organisations, such as the convention of delegates from Jewish youth organisations of various nations, attended by David Ben-Gurion, which founded the World Union of Jewish Youth on 2 September 1924 in the Schützenhaus venue. On 21 March 1926 the Zionistische Organisation für Danzig convened delegates of Hechalutz from all over for the first conference in Danzig using Hebrew as common language, also attended by Ben Gurion.

With a Nazi majority in the Volkstag and Senate, anti-Semitic persecution and discrimination occurred unsanctioned by the authorities. In contrast to Germany, which exercised capital outflow control since 1931, emigration of Danzig's Jews was nonetheless somewhat easier, with capital transfers enabled by the Bank of Danzig. Moreover, the comparatively few Danzig Jews were offered easier refuge in safe countries because of favorable Free City migration quotas.

After the anti-Jewish riots of Kristallnacht of 9/10 November 1938 in Germany, similar riots took place on 12/13 November in Danzig. The Great Synagogue was taken over and demolished by the local authorities in 1939. Most Jews had already left the city, and the Jewish Community of Danzig decided to organize its own emigration in early 1939.

Politics

Government

The Free City was governed by the Senate of the Free City of Danzig, which was elected by the parliament (Volkstag) for a legislative period of four years. The official language was German, although the usage of Polish was guaranteed by law. The political parties in the Free City corresponded with the political parties in Weimar Germany; the most influential parties in the 1920s were the conservative German National People's Party, the Social Democratic Party of the Free City of Danzig and the Catholic Centre Party. A Communist Party was founded in 1921 with its origins in the Spartacus League and the Communist Party of East Prussia. Several liberal parties and Free Voter's Associations existed and ran in the elections with varying success. A Polish Party represented the Polish minority and received between 3% (1933) and 6% (1920) of the vote (in total, 4,358 votes in 1933 and 9,321 votes in 1920).

Initially, the Nazi Party had only a small amount of success (0.8% of the vote in 1927) and was even briefly dissolved. Its influence grew with the onset of difficult economic times and the increasing popularity of the Nazi Party in Germany proper. Albert Forster became the Gauleiter in October 1930. The Nazis won 50 percent of votes in the Volkstag elections of 28 May 1933, and took control of the Senate in June 1933, with Hermann Rauschning becoming President of the Senate of Danzig.

Rauschning was removed from his position by Forster and replaced by Arthur Greiser in November 1934. He later appealed to the public not to vote for the Nazis in the 1935 elections. Political opposition to the Nazis was repressed with several politicians being imprisoned and murdered. The economic policy of Danzig's Nazi-led government, which increased the public expenditures for employment-creation programs and the retrenchment of financial aid from Germany led to a devaluation of more than 40% of the Danziger Gulden in 1935. The Gold reserves of the Bank of Danzig declined from 30 million Gulden in 1933 to 13 million in 1935 and the foreign asset reserve from 10 million to 250,000 Gulden. In 1935, Poland protested when Danzig's Senate reduced the value of the Gulden so that it would be the same as the Polish zloty.

As in Germany, the Nazis introduced laws mirroring the Enabling Act and Nuremberg laws (November 1938); existing parties and unions were gradually banned. The presence of the League of Nations however still guaranteed a minimum of legal certainty. In 1935, the opposition parties, except for the Polish Party, filed a lawsuit to the Danzig High Court in protest against the manipulation of the Volkstag elections. The opposition also protested to the League of Nations, as did the Jewish Community of Danzig. The number of members of the Nazi Party in Danzig increased from 21,861 in June 1934 to 48,345 in September 1938.

Foreign relations
Foreign relations were handled by Poland. In 1927, the Free City of Danzig sent a military advisory mission to Bolivia. The Bolivian government of Hernando Siles Reyes wanted to continue the pre-World War I German military mission but the Treaty of Versailles prohibited that. The German officers, including Ernst Röhm, were transferred to the Danzig police force and then sent to Bolivia. In 1929, after problems with the mission, the British embassy handled the return of the German officers.

German-Polish tensions

The rights of the Second Polish Republic within the territory of the Free City were stipulated in the Treaty of Paris of 9 November 1920 and the Treaty of Warsaw of 24 October 1921. The details of the Polish privileges soon became a permanent matter of disputes between the local populace and the Polish State. While the representatives of the Free City tried to uphold the city's autonomy and sovereignty, Poland sought to extend its privileges.

Throughout the Polish–Soviet War, local dockworkers went on strike and refused to unload ammunition supplies for the Polish Army. While the ammunition was finally unloaded by British troops, the incident led to the establishment of a permanent ammunition depot at the Westerplatte and the construction of a trade and naval port in Gdynia, whose total exports and imports surpassed those of Danzig in May 1932. In December 1925, the Council of the League of Nations agreed to the establishment of a Polish military guard of 88 men on the Westerplatte peninsula to protect the war material depot.

During the interwar period the Polish minority was heavily discriminated against by the German population, which openly attacked its members using racist slurs and harassment, and attacks against the Polish consulate by German students were praised by authorities. In June 1932, a crisis broke out when the Polish destroyer ORP Wicher was sent into Danzig harbour without the permission of the Senate to greet a visiting squadron of British destroyers. The crisis was resolved when the Free City granted more access rights to the Polish Navy in exchange for a promise to not take the Wicher back into Danzig harbour.

Several disputes between Danzig and Poland occurred in the sequel. The Free City protested against the Westerplatte depot, the placement of Polish letter boxes within the City and the presence of Polish war vessels at the harbour. The attempt of the Free City to join the International Labour Organization was rejected by the Permanent Court of International Justice at the League of Nations after protests of the Polish ILO delegate.
	
After Adolf Hitler came to power in Germany, the Polish military doubled the number of 88 troops at Westerplatte in order to test the reaction of the new chancellor. After protests the additional troops were withdrawn. Nazi propaganda used these events in the Volkstag elections of May 1933, in which Nazis won absolute majority.

Until June 1933, the High Commissioner decided in 66 cases of dispute between Danzig and Poland; in 54 cases one of the parties appealed to the Permanent Court of International Justice. Subsequent disputes were resolved in direct negotiations between the Senate and Poland after both had agreed to abstain from further appeals to the International Court in the summer of 1933 and bilateral agreements were concluded.

In the aftermath of the German-Polish Non-Aggression Pact of 1934, Danzig–Polish relations improved and Adolf Hitler instructed the local Nazi government to cease anti-Polish actions.  In return, Poland did not support the actions of the anti-Nazi opposition in Danzig. The Polish Ambassador to Germany, Józef Lipski, stated in a meeting with Hermann Göring
"... that a National Socialist Senate in Danzig is also most desirable from our point of view, since it brought about a rapprochement between the Free City and Poland, I would like to remind him that we have always kept aloof from internal Danzig problems. In spite of approaches repeatedly made by the opposition parties, we rejected any attempt to draw us into action against the Senate. I mentioned quite confidentially that the Polish minority in Danzig was advised not to join forces with the opposition at the time of elections."
When Carl J. Burckhardt became High Commissioner in February 1937, both Poles and Germans openly welcomed his withdrawal, and Polish Minister of Foreign Affairs Józef Beck notified him not to "count on the support of the Polish State" in the case of difficulties with the Senate or the Nazi Party.

While the Senate appeared to respect the agreements with Poland, the "Nazification of Danzig proceeded relentlessly" and Danzig became a springboard for anti-Polish propaganda among the German and Ukrainian minority in Poland. The Catholic Bishop of Danzig, Edward O'Rourke, was forced to withdraw after he had tried to implement four additional Polish nationals as parish priests in October 1937.

Danzig crisis

The German policy openly changed immediately after the Munich Conference in October 1938, when German Minister of Foreign Affairs Joachim von Ribbentrop demanded the incorporation of the Free City into the Reich. The Polish ambassador to Germany, Jozef Lipski, declined Ribbentrop's offer, saying that Polish public opinion would not tolerate the Free City joining Germany and predicated that if Warsaw allowed that to happen, then the Sanation military dictatorship that had ruled Poland since 1926 would be overthrown.   Ernst von Weizsäcker on 29 March 1939 told the Danzig government the Reich would carry out a policy to the Zermürbungspolitik (point of destruction) towards Poland, saying a compromise solution was not wanted, and on 5 April 1939 told Hans-Adolf von Moltke under no conditions was he to negotiate with the Poles.

All through the spring and summer of 1939 there was a massive media campaign in Germany demanding the immediate return of the Free City of Danzig to Germany under the slogan "Home to the Reich!". However, the Danzig crisis was a just a pretext for war. Ribbentrop ordered Count Hans-Adolf von Moltke, the German ambassador to Poland, not to negotiate with the Poles over Danzig as it was always Ribbentrop's great fear that the Poles might actually agree to the Free City returning to Germany, thereby depriving the Reich of its pretext for attacking Poland.

In the middle of August, Beck offered a concession, saying that Poland was willing to give up its control of Danzig's customs, a proposal which caused fury in Berlin. However, the leaders of the Free City sent a message to Berlin on 19 August 1939 saying: "Gauleiter Forster intends to extend claims...Should the Poles yield again it is intended to increase the claims further in order to make accord impossible". The same day a telegram from Berlin expressed approval with the proviso: "Discussions will have to be conducted and pressure exerted against Poland in such a way that responsibility for failure to come to an agreement and the consequences rest with Poland". On 23 August 1939, Albert Forster, the Gauleiter of Danzig, called a meeting of the Senate that voted to have the Free City rejoin Germany, raising tensions to the breaking point. The same meeting appointed Forster the Danzig State President, through this was due to Forster's long-running rivalry with Arthur Greiser, a völkisch fanatic who regarded Forster as too soft on the Poles. Both the appointment of Forster as State President and the resolution calling for the Free City to rejoin the Reich were violations of the charter the League of Nations had given Danzig in 1920, and the matter should have been taken to the League of Nations's Security Council for discussion.

Since these violations of the Danzig charter would have resulted in the League deposing the Danzig's Nazi government, both the French and British prevented the matter from being referred to the Security Council. Instead the British and French applied strong pressure on the Poles not to send in a military force to depose the Danzig government, and appoint a mediator to resolve the crisis. By late August 1939, the crisis continued to escalate with the Senate confiscating on 27 August 1939 stocks of wheat, salt and petrol that belonged to the Polish businesses that were in the process of being exported or imported via the Free City, an action that led to sharp Polish complaints. The same day, 200 Polish workers at the Danzig shipyards were fired without severance pay and their identification papers revoked, meaning that they legally could not live in Danzig anymore. The Danzig government imposed food rationing, the Danzig newspapers took a militantly anti-Polish line, and almost every day there were "incidents" on the border with Poland. Ordinary people in Danzig were described as being highly worried in the last days of August 1939 as it become apparent that war was imminent. In the meantime, the German battleship Schleswig-Holstein had arrived in Danzig on 15 August. Originally, it was planned to send the light cruiser Königsberg to Danzig for what was described as a "friendship visit", but it was decided at the last minute that a ship with more firepower was needed, leading to the Schleswig-Holstein with its  guns being substituted. Upon anchoring in Danzig harbor, the Schleswig-Holstein ominously aimed its guns at the Polish Military Depot on the Westerplatte peninsula in a provocative gesture that further raised the tensions in the Free City.

At about 4:48am on 1 September 1939, the Schleswig-Holstein opened fire on the Westerplatte, firing the first shots of World War II.

Second World War and aftermath

On 1 September 1939, the day of the German invasion of the Free City of Danzig, Foster signed a law declaring the Free City to be incorporated into Germany. On the same day, Hitler signed a law declaring the law signed by Foster to be German law and the Free City of Danzig was officially incorporated into Germany.

The Polish military forces in the city held out until 7 September.

Up to 4,500 members of the Polish minority were arrested with many of them executed. In the city itself hundreds of Polish prisoners were subjected to cruel executions and experiments, which included castration of men and sterilization of women considered dangerous to the "purity of Nordic race" and beheading by guillotine. The judicial system was one of the main tools of extermination policy towards Poles led by Nazi Germany in the city and verdicts were motivated by statements that Poles were subhuman.
By the end of the Second World War, nearly all of the city had been reduced to ruins. On 30 March 1945, the city was taken by the Red Army.

At the Yalta Conference in February 1945, the Allies agreed that the city would become part of Poland. No formal treaty has ever altered the status of the Free City of Danzig, and its incorporation into Poland has rested upon the general acquiescence of the international community. In 1947, a Free City of Danzig Government in Exile was established.

The expulsion of the pre-war inhabitants started already before the decisions of the Potsdam conference of August 1945. From June to October an estimated number of 60,000 residents were expelled by Polish authorities, often units of the Polish Armed Forces, the Polish State Security and the Milicja Obywatelska encircled certain areas and forced the inhabitants to make room for newly arrived Polish settlers. About 20,000 Germans left on their own and by late 1945 between 10,000 and 15,000 pre-war inhabitants remained.
By 1950, around 285,000 fled and expelled citizens of the former Free City were living in Germany, and 13,424 citizens of the former Free City had been "verified" and granted Polish citizenship. By 1947, 126,472 Danzigers of German ethnicity were expelled to Germany from Gdańsk, and 101,873 Poles from Central Poland and 26,629 from Soviet-annexed Eastern Poland took their place (these figures refer to the city of Gdańsk itself, not to the whole area of pre-war Free City).

Origin of the post-war population 

During the Polish post-war census of December 1950, data about the pre-war places of residence of the inhabitants as of August 1939 was collected. In case of children born between September 1939 and December 1950, their origin was reported based on the pre-war places of residence of their mothers. Thanks to this data it is possible to reconstruct the pre-war geographical origin of the post-war population. The same territory which corresponded to pre-war Free City of Danzig was inhabited in December 1950 by:

At least 85% of the population as of December 1950 were post-war newcomers, but over 10% of inhabitants were still pre-war Danzigers (most of them members of pre-war Polish and Kashubian minorities in the Free City of Danzig). Another 25% came from neighbouring areas of pre-war Polish Pomerania. Almost 20% were Poles from areas of former Eastern Poland annexed by the USSR (many from Wilno Voivodeship). Several percent came from the city of Warsaw, which had been largely destroyed in 1944.

See also
 Administrations of Danzig before April 1945
 Allgemeiner Arbeiterverband der Freien Stadt Danzig
 Areas annexed by Nazi Germany
 Danzig Corridor
 Danzig Research Society
 Alfons Flisykowski
 History of Gdańsk

References

Further reading
 
 
 Tadeusz Maciejewski and Maja Maciejewska-Szałas. 2019. "Constitutional Systems of Free European States (1918–1939)." in Modernisation, National Identity and Legal Instrumentalism. Brill.
 – Polish abstract title: "Tożsamości kulturowa gdańszczan w ujęciu etnolingwistycznym na przykładzie wybranych tekstów publicystycznych Wolnego Miasta Gdańska"
  – At Pomeranian Digital Library
 Poland, Germany, and Danzig. (May 20, 1939). Bulletin of International News, Royal Institute of International Affairs; 16(10), 3–13. 
 Mr. Chamberlain’s Review of the Danzig Question. (Jul. 15, 1939). Bulletin of International News, Royal Institute of International Affairs; 16(14), 11–12. 
 Danzig, Germany, and Poland. (Aug. 26, 1939). Bulletin of International News, Royal Institute of International Affairs; 16(17), 12–18.

External links

 Extensive Prussian/ Danzig Historical Materials  (many in German)
 Map of the Free City
 Jewish community history
 History of Gdańsk / Danzig
 Danzig Online
 Gdańsk history
 Celebration of Gdańsk's centenary in 1997
 History & Hallucination, Wanderlust, Salon.com, January 5, 1998.
 
 1933 Danzig passport, from passportland.com.
 First hand account of growing up in Danzig in the 1930s, a video interview.

 
States and territories established in 1920
League of Nations mandates
1920 establishments in Europe
1939 disestablishments in Europe
Holocaust locations in Poland
Former countries of the interwar period
States and territories disestablished in 1939
Former republics
City-states